Kashmir is an alternative rock band from Karachi, Pakistan. It is the winning band of Pepsi Battle of the Bands Season 2 in 2017. Formed in 2012, the band played for various shows across the country prior to PBOB. The band consists of Bilal Ali (Vocalist), Vais Khan (lead guitarist), Usman Siddiqui (bass guitarist), Shane J. Anthoney (drummer), Zair Zaki (rhythm guitarist), and Ali Raza (keyboardist). The band has won Rs. 5 million, a music album contract, concerts across Pakistan and lifetime royalties on their music from the Battle of the Bands competition leaving the Badnaam Band as a runner-up. Kashmir Band won the Lux Style Award for Best Emerging Talent (Music) 2017 for their song "Kaaghaz Ka Jahaaz".

Background 
Over two months and seven (weekly) episodes on television and social media Pepsi Battle of the Bands ended with the trophy going to Kashmir, while the Sufi-rock band Badnaam were declared runners-up, in the final conclusion of the show on the basis of public votes.

Post Pepsi Battle of the Band
After winning Pepsi Battle of the Band, Kashmir released "Pareshaaniyan" and "Khwab" on 10 and 11 May 2018 respectively on their YouTube and SoundCloud channel as a part of their upcoming album.

Acoustic Station 
Kashmir featured in the first episode of Acoustic Station produced by Kashan Admani at Dream Station Productions and performed a rendition of their song Soch.

Discography

Pepsi Battle of the Bands
 Hamesha (EP cover)
 Mera Piyar (Aamir Zaki cover)
 Buddha Baba (Original)
 Waqt (EP cover)
 Faisaly (Original)
 Mendah Ishq (Sir Pathanay Khan cover)
 Soch (Original)
 Ankahi (Aadat (Atif Aslam)-Aitebar (Vital Signs) mashup/cover)
 Kaaghaz Ka Jahaz (Original)
 Parwana Hun (Original)

Studio albums
 Khwaab (2020)

Band members

Final Line-up 
Bilal Ali – vocals (2013–present)
Vais Khan – lead guitar (2011–present)
Usman Siddiqui – bass guitar (2011–present)
Shane J. Anthoney – drums, percussion (2014–present)
Zair Zaki – rhythm guitar (2012–present)
Ali Raza – keyboard, backing vocals (2011–present)
 Former Members
Mashhad Shahryar - Lead Vocals  (2011-2013) 
Hyder Ali - Drums  (2013-2015)

Timeline

Awards and nominations

|-
! colspan="4" style="background:#bfd7ff"|17th Lux Style Awards
|-
|2017
|Kaaghaz Ka Jahaaz
|Best Emerging Talent in Music
|
|}

See also 
 List of Pakistani music bands

References

External links
 Official YouTube channel
 Official SoundCloud channel

Musical groups established in 2011
Musical groups from Karachi
Pakistani musical groups
Pakistani rock music groups
2011 establishments in Pakistan